Kumbulak is a hamlet in the Tuzluca district of the Iğdır Province in Turkey, with a population of about 20.  The village economy is based on agriculture and animal husbandry.

References 

Villages in Iğdır Province
Populated places in Iğdır Province
Towns in Turkey